Randall Baker is an American environmental historian, currently at Indiana University. He was awarded an honorary degree from Moscow State University, University of Sofia and Baku State University and also Honorary Professor at Western University (Azerbaijan) and New Bulgarian University.

References

Year of birth missing (living people)
Living people
Indiana University faculty
American environmentalists
Environmental historians